The Jardin des Paradis (3000 m²) is a private garden located on the Place du Théron, Cordes-sur-Ciel, Tarn, Midi-Pyrénées, France. It has been recognized as a Jardin Remarquable since 2004, and is open daily in the warmer months; an admission fee is charged.

The garden was created in 1997 by Eric Ossart and Arnaud Maurières with Brazilian landscape architect Roberto Burle Marx, and opened to the public in 1998. It is designed in an unusual blend of contemporary, oriental, and medieval styles, and organized as three terraces. Notable features include a rectangular pond serving as water garden, and a vegetable garden with chard, leeks, mallow, peppers (30 varieties), pumpkins, and tomatoes (over 60 varieties).

See also 
 List of botanical gardens in France

References 

 Jardin des Paradis
 Cordes-sur-Ciel: Jardin des Paradis
 GetFrench description
 Gralon entry (French)
 1001 Fleurs entry (French)
 Conservatoire des Jardins et Paysages entry (French)

Paradis, Jardin des
Paradis, Jardin des